Shahzad Bashir is a Pakistani former cricketer. He played eighteen first-class matches for Lahore and Pakistan Automobiles Corporation cricket team between 1981 and 1985.

See also
 List of Pakistan Automobiles Corporation cricketers

References

External links
 

Year of birth missing (living people)
Living people
Pakistani cricketers
Lahore cricketers
Pakistan Automobiles Corporation cricketers
Place of birth missing (living people)